James Vallo is an American producer and actor who played the role of Al Manac in Space Daze and its sequel Spaced Out. His productions include Sister Mary, Not Another B Movie, Chasing Hollywood and Paranormal Calamity.

Filmography

References

External links
 West Bridge Entertainment
 

Year of birth missing (living people)
Living people
American male film actors
Film producers from Illinois
American male television actors
Northern Illinois University alumni
Columbia College Chicago alumni
Male actors from Illinois
People from McHenry County, Illinois
People from Kane County, Illinois
People from DuPage County, Illinois
People from Grayslake, Illinois